Irby Hall is a 17th-century Grade II listed manor house located in Irby, Wirral. Built upon a former 11th century manor and courthouse of St Werburgh Abbey and surrounded by a moat the overall site has been designated as a Scheduled monument.

References

Grade II listed buildings in Merseyside
Timber framed buildings in England